Guilherme Roth dos Santos (born 11 October 1982 in Caxias do Sul) is a Brazilian competitive swimmer.

He swam at the 2002 Pan Pacific Swimming Championships, where he finished 4th in the 4×100-metre freestyle, and 14th in the 50-metre freestyle. 

At the 2006 FINA World Swimming Championships (25 m), in Shanghai, he was a finalist in the 4×100-metre freestyle, finishing 5th, and in the 50-metre freestyle, finishing 8th. He also ranked 19th in the 100-metre freestyle, and 9th in the 4×100-metre medley.

He joined the Brazilian national delegation who attended the 2009 World Aquatics Championships in Rome, where he competed in the 4×100-metre freestyle, along with César Cielo, Fernando Silva and Nicolas Oliveira. The team finished the final in fourth place, with a time of 3:10.80, South American record.

At the 2010 South American Games, Roth won the silver medal in the 4×100-metre freestyle.

Participating in the 2012 FINA World Swimming Championships (25 m) in Istanbul, he went to the 4×100-metre medley final, finishing 4th, and the 4×100-metre freestyle final, finishing 6th. He was also 15th in the 100-metre freestyle.

References

External links 
 

1982 births
Living people
People from Caxias do Sul
Brazilian male freestyle swimmers
South American Games silver medalists for Brazil
South American Games medalists in swimming
Competitors at the 2010 South American Games
Sportspeople from Rio Grande do Sul
21st-century Brazilian people
20th-century Brazilian people